The International Journal of Applied Management and Technology (IJAMT) is an international peer-reviewed journal in the fields of applied management and applied technology. The journal is sponsored by The School of Management at Walden University. It has listed its goals as: 
 Encourage collaborative and multi-disciplinary examinations of important issues in business and technology management. 
 Engage scholars and scholar-practitioners in a dynamic and important dialogue. 
 Contribute original knowledge and expand understanding in the fields of: 
 Applied management
 Decision sciences 
 Information Systems management
 Knowledge and learning management 
 Emerging technologies 
 Project management 
 Business process improvement 
 e-Business strategies
 Operations research 
 Leadership and organizational change
 Public and non-profit administration 
 Public Policy 

IJAMT is published biannually, in May and November, and is available online.

External links
Official website

Applied Management and Technology, International Journal of
Biannual journals
Open access journals